The Estádio D. Afonso Henriques (English: D. Afonso Henriques Stadium) is a football stadium in the city of Guimarães, Portugal.

The stadium is home of Guimarães's most successful team, Vitória de Guimarães, presently competing in the top-flight Portuguese Liga. The stadium was built in 1965 and was renovated and expanded in 2003 for the UEFA Euro 2004 tournament by architect Eduardo Guimarães. Estádio D. Afonso Henriques has a capacity of 30,029 and it is named after the first King of Portugal—and also a Guimarães native—Dom Afonso Henriques. It was formerly known as Estádio Municipal de Guimarães, and before that as the Estádio D. Afonso Henriques (1965).

During Euro 2004, the stadium hosted two of the tournament's matches.

Games held
The first game in the stadium after the renovation in 2003 was played on 25 July 2003 between Vitória de Guimarães and 1. FC Kaiserslautern which was won by the hosting team with a 4–1 victory.

The Estádio D. Afonso Henriques hosted two games at UEFA Euro 2004. The opening fixture of Group C was between Denmark and Italy, in which the match ended 0–0. The last fixture of Group C was also played at the stadium, this time between Bulgaria and Italy, in which it ended 2–1 to Italy with goals from Martin Petrov for Bulgaria and goals from Simone Perrotta and Antonio Cassano for Italy. Although Cassano's 94th-minute strike won the game for Italy 2–1, in the other game between Denmark and Sweden, it ended 2–2 with a 89th-minute strike from Mattias Jonson. Jonson's goal resulted in Italy's exit out of the tournament on goals scored in third place, behind Sweden in second place and Denmark in first place.

Portugal national football team
The following national team matches were held in the stadium.

UEFA Euro 2004

UEFA Nations League 2019 Finals

Miklós Fehér's death
The stadium witnessed the collapse of Sport Lisboa e Benfica player Miklós Fehér. This occurred during a league match between Vitória de Guimarães and Benfica on 25 January 2004. Late into the second half, Fehér received a yellow card shortly after coming on as a substitute. He then collapsed and went into cardiac arrest, later dying in hospital. Every time Benfica play in Guimarães, there is a remembrance ceremony at the location where Fehér collapsed.

References

External links

Estádio D. Afonso Henriques 

UEFA Euro 2004 stadiums
D. Afonso Henriques
Vitória S.C.
Buildings and structures in Guimarães
Sports venues in Braga District
Sports venues completed in 1965